A tarand, also known as a tarandos, tarandus, parandrus, or parandros, is a legendary reindeer/moose-like creature with chameleon properties. It was first described in 
Aristotle's Corpus Aristotelicum as Tarandos (Τάρανδος).
It was also mentioned in Pliny's History of the Animals (Tarandus), Aelian's De Natura Animalium (Tarandos), Solinus (Parandrus) and Caesar, appearing again in key texts of the medieval period, such as  The York Mystery Cycle (1440) and Francois Rabelais' Pantagruel (1552). The veracity of the tarand was discussed by Jean Léopold Nicolas Frédéric, Baron Cuvier (1769–1832).

Aristotle, Pliny and Aelian write that the animal (Tarandus) was living in Scythia, while Solinus write that the animal that he describes (Parandus) was living in Aethiopia.

Origin and description

Aristotle

Pliny
After having described the chameleon, Pliny (trans. Holland, 1601) provided a detailed description and discussion of the tarand:

Aelian

Appearances in literature

According to the Oxford English Dictionary, the first reference in English to the tarand is in the medieval play The York Mystery Cycle ("All þin vntrew techyngis þus taste I, þou tarand", or in modern English "All your untrue teachings thus I test, you tarand").

The tarand is described in Book 4, Chapter 2 of Francois Rabelais' Pantagruel (1552):

The tarand is mentioned again in Pantagruel: "I have found here a Scythian tarand, an animal strange and wonderful for the variations of colour on its skin and hair, according to the distinction of neighbouring things; it is as tractable and easily kept as a lamb. Be pleased to accept of it."

References 

European legendary creatures
Legendary mammals